Soltanabad (also Romanized as Solţānābād; also known as Solţānābād-e Ḩūmeh and Soltan Abad Hoomeh) is a village in Qarah Bagh Rural District, in the Central District of Shiraz County, Fars Province, Iran. At the 2006 census, its population was 3,383, in 824 families.

References 

Populated places in Shiraz County